Cyrtophorus verrucosus is a species of beetle in the family Cerambycidae, the only species in the genus Cyrtophorus. It can be distinguished from other ant mimicking Longhorned Beetles by the humps on each shoulder. the

References

Anaglyptini